Paul Heimen (16 March 1898 – 25 August 1978) was a German painter. His work was part of the painting event in the art competition at the 1932 Summer Olympics.

References

1898 births
1978 deaths
20th-century German painters
20th-century German male artists
German male painters
Olympic competitors in art competitions
Artists from North Rhine-Westphalia